Stefan Jerome (born August 11, 1992 in Davie, Florida) is an American soccer player. He played for Sigma Olomouc in the Gambrinus Liga in 2011.

Background
Jerome was born in Davie, Florida and is of Haitian descent.

Career

Club
Jerome attended American Heritage High School, who he led to the 2007 Florida High School Athletic Association's Class 3A title game, played club soccer for West Pines FC in Pembroke Pines, Florida and Schulz Academy program in Boca Raton Florida until he was invited to attend the residency program, and spent two years in US soccer residency program  at the famed IMG Academy in Bradenton, Florida, before being signed by Miami FC in June 2010. At the time of his signing he was the youngest player in Miami FC team history.

He made his professional debut on June 19, 2010 as a substitute in a 3-1 loss to the Austin Aztex.

After trialling with Sigma Olomouc in January 2011, Jerome signed on loan with the club until the end of the 2010-11 season.

International
Jerome has been an active member of the US youth national teams and was on the team that played at the 2009 FIFA U-17 World Cup in Nigeria. He has also received callups for the U-20 team camp and also played with the U-20 men's at the 2010 Copa Chivas tournament.

References

External links
US Soccer profile

1992 births
Living people
American soccer players
American sportspeople of Haitian descent
Miami FC (2006) players
Fort Lauderdale Strikers players
Czech First League players
SK Sigma Olomouc players
USSF Division 2 Professional League players
Soccer players from Florida
United States men's youth international soccer players
Association football forwards
People from Davie, Florida
Sportspeople from Pembroke Pines, Florida